Count Konstanty Tyzenhauz (3 June 1786 – 16 March 1853) was a Polish-Lithuanian nobleman, naturalist, artist, and patron of ornithology in Poland. He made a large collection of eggs and bird skins at his estate in Postawy (now in Belarus). 

Tyzenhaus was born in Żołudek near Grodno to Count Ignacy and Maria Przezdziecka. After education at the University of Vilnius, he took part in the Napoleonic Wars (1812-14). It was shortly after the war that he became familiar with taxidermic techniques at the Paris Museum of Natural History. French was a second language in the Polish-Lithuanian artistocracy and his correspondents included Félix Édouard Guérin-Méneville (1799-1874). He was awarded a Officer's Cross of the Legion of Honor on August 10, 1813, and he continued to live in Clermont not returning to Lithuania until the Tsar declared an amnesty for former soldiers of the Grand Army. He then took a keen interest in the birds of the Vilnius region and made collections of eggs and skins. He also wrote some books on ornithology. A trained artist (a student of Jan Piotr Norblin), he also illustrated plates for books by Władysław Taczanowski. After his death, the zoological collections (with 1093 skins and 563 eggs) were donated by his son Rajnold Tyzenhauz (1830-1880) to the Archaeological Commission of Vilnius and became part of the Museum of Antiquities.

References

External links 
 Zasady ornitologii, albo nauki o ptakach obejmujące: rys postępu jej literatury, taxonomią, glossologią i terminologią (1841)
 Ornitologia powszechna, czyli opisanie ptaków wszystkich części świata. Volume 1 (1842) Volume 2 (1844) Volume 3 (1846)

1786 births
1853 deaths
Polish ornithologists